Doles Ash is a farm in Dorset, England, a few kilometers east of Piddletrenthide and south of Plush.

The farm features in Thomas Hardy's Tess of the D'urbervilles as Flintcomb-Ash, the "starve-acre" farm where Tess goes to dig swedes with Marion.

References  

Hamlets in Dorset